Bob B.M. Wong is a Professor in the School of Biological Sciences at Monash University, Australia, and the Secretary of the International Society for Behavioral Ecology (ISBE). He is a biologist and academic with his research focusing on the evolution of animal mating systems and behavior, and how investment in sex influences reproductive strategies and biological diversity. His current work focuses on the impacts of environmental change on animal behaviour and the evolutionary process. In 2019 he became a subject editor for Animal Behaviour and Oikos Journal. He was granted a Future Fellowship by the Australian Research Council and is also Chair of the Organizing Committee for the upcoming 2024 Congress of the ISBE in Melbourne, Australia. He was born in Singapore and currently resides in Melbourne, Victoria.

Wong is publicly open about his identity as a gay man. In describing himself and his career, he has stated "As an academic of Asian heritage and a member of the LGBTQI+ community, I am a strong advocate for diversity in STEM."

Wong's research covers a range of animal species, from fish to invertebrates.

Selected publications

References

External links 

Bob Wong Laboratory website

Australian biologists
Living people
Monash University alumni
Australian National University alumni
Academic staff of Monash University
Year of birth missing (living people)
Australian LGBT scientists
Gay academics
Gay scientists
21st-century Australian LGBT people